Araucaria angustifolia, the Paraná pine, Brazilian pine or candelabra tree (or ), is a critically endangered species in the conifer genus Araucaria. Although the common names in various languages refer to the species as a "pine", it does not belong in the genus Pinus.

Origin and taxonomy 
The genus Araucaria was part of terrestrial flora since the Triassic and found its apogee in Gondwana. Today, it is restricted to the Southern Hemisphere and has 19 species.

Distribution

It is native to southern Brazil (also found in high-altitude areas of southern Minas Gerais, in central Rio de Janeiro and in the east and south of São Paulo, but more typically in the states of Paraná, Santa Catarina and Rio Grande do Sul). According to a study made by Brazilian researcher Reinhard Maack, the original area of occurrence represented 36.67% of the Paraná state, 60.13% of the Santa Catarina state, 21.6% of the São Paulo state and 17.38% of the Rio Grande do Sul state.

The prehistoric distribution of A. angustifolia in earlier geologic periods was very different to the present day, fossils were found in northeastern Brazil. The present day range is recent, the species moving into this area during the later Pleistocene and early Holocene. This chorological shift may possibly be due to climatic change and the migration of mountain flora by way of river courses.

Description

The tree is fast growing; as much as  a year ( in 14 years) at Puerto Piray, Misiones Province, Argentina. They persist 10 to 15 years, so cover most of the tree except for the trunk and older branches. The bark is uncommonly thick; up to six inches (15 centimeters) deep.
. It is closely related to Araucaria araucana from further southwest in South America, differing most conspicuously in the narrower leaves.

It is usually dioecious, with the male and female cones on separate trees. Like all conifers it is wind pollinated. The female cones (seed), which mature in autumn about 18 months after pollination, are globose, large,  in diameter, and hold about 100–150 seeds.

The inner bark and resin from the trunk of the tree is reddish, which can be a good defining character because it differs from A. araucana, which has brown bark inner and white resin.

Habitat and ecology
It prefers well drained, slightly acidic soil but will tolerate almost any soil type provided drainage is good.

The seeds are very important for the native animals.

In a long term study observing the feeding behaviour throughout the year of the squirrel Guerlinguetus brasiliensis ssp. ingrami in a secondary A. angustifolia forest in the Parque Recreativo Primavera in the vicinity of the city of Curitiba, Paraná, of the ten plant species of which the squirrel ate the seeds or nuts, seeds of A. angustifolia were the most important food item in the fall, with a significant percentage of their diet in the winter consisting of the seeds as well.

The squirrels cache seeds, but it is unclear how this affects recruitment.

Human use

It is a popular garden tree in subtropical areas, planted for its unusual effect of the thick, 'reptilian' branches with a very symmetrical appearance.

The seeds, similar to large pine nuts, are edible, and are extensively harvested in southern Brazil (Paraná, Santa Catarina and Rio Grande do Sul states), an occupation particularly important for the region's small population of natives (the Kaingáng and other Southern Jê). The seeds, called   are popular as a winter snack. The city of Lages, in Santa Catarina, holds a popular  fair, in which mulled wine and boiled Araucaria seeds are consumed.  of seeds are collected annually in Brazil.

It is also used as a softwood timber in stair treads and joinery. The species is widely used in folk medicine.

A. angustifolia is grown as an ornamental plant in parks of towns and cities of Chile, from Santiago to Valdivia. It grows better in low altitudes than the local Araucaria araucana, hence its use as substitute in the Central Valley and coastal regions of Chile. In some places like the town of Melipeuco A. angustifolia can be seen growing side by side with A. araucana.

The hybrid Araucaria angustifolia × araucana is thought to have first arisen "in a plantation forestry environment in Argentina sometime in the late 19th or early 20th century". It is thus not a natural hybrid as there are more than 1000 km between the natural stands of the two species.

Conservation
According to one calculation it has lost an estimated 97% of its habitat to logging, agriculture, and silviculture in the last century. People also eat the seeds, which may reduce recruitment. It was therefore listed by the IUCN as 'vulnerable in 1998 and 'critically endangered' in 2008.

References

External links 

 Araucaria angustifolia at The Plant List

angustifolia
Trees of Argentina
Trees of Brazil
Trees of Paraguay
Flora of the Atlantic Forest
Flora of Minas Gerais
Flora of Paraná (state)
Flora of Rio Grande do Sul
Flora of Santa Catarina (state)
Flora of São Paulo (state)
Edible nuts and seeds
Trees of mild maritime climate
Critically endangered flora of South America
Plants described in 1898
Garden plants of South America
Ornamental trees
Species endangered by logging for timber
Species endangered by logging for firewood
Species endangered by use as food
Species endangered by the pet trade